The 1992–93 North Carolina Tar Heels men's basketball team represented the University of North Carolina in the 1992-93 NCAA Division I men's basketball season as a member of the Atlantic Coast Conference. They finished the season 34–4 overall, won the ACC regular season title with a 14–2 record and won the 1993 national championship. They were coached by Dean Smith, who won his second national championship in his thirty-second season as head coach of the Tar Heels. They played their home games at the Dean Smith Center in Chapel Hill, North Carolina.

Season summary

The 1992-93 team was led by George Lynch, Eric Montross, Brian Reese, Donald Williams, and Derrick Phelps. The Tar Heels started out with an 8–0 record and were ranked #5 in the country when they met #6 Michigan in the semi-finals of the Rainbow Classic. The Wolverines, led by the Fab Five in their sophomore season, won 79–78 to on a last-second shot. North Carolina bounced back with nine straight wins before losing back-to-back road games against unranked Wake Forest and #5 Duke. After seven more straight wins, the Tar Heels were ranked #1 heading into the last week of the regular season (their first #1 ranking since the start of the 1987–88 season).  North Carolina beat #14 Wake Forest and #6 Duke to close out the regular season and clinch the top seed in the ACC tournament. North Carolina reached the tournament final, but they lost 77–75 to Georgia Tech without Derrick Phelps who was injured. Nonetheless, North Carolina was awarded the top seed in the East Regional of the NCAA tournament, defeating #16-seed East Carolina (85–65), #8-seed Rhode Island (112-67), #4-seed Arkansas (80–74), and #2-seed Cincinnati (75–68) to reach the final four in New Orleans.

In the national semi-finals, Smith's Tar Heels defeated his alma mater Kansas (coached by future North Carolina coach Roy Williams) 78–68, setting up a rematch with #3-ranked Michigan in the finals.

The national title game was a see-saw battle throughout, but is remembered best for Chris Webber's time out call with seconds left when Michigan didn't have any. Michigan was assessed a technical foul and North Carolina ended up winning 77–71, giving Smith his second national championship.

Personnel

Schedule and results

|-
!colspan=9| ACC tournament

|-
!colspan=9| NCAA tournament

Awards and honors
 Dean Smith, Naismith College Coach of the Year
 Donald Williams, NCAA Men's MOP Award

Team players drafted into the NBA

Kevin Salvadori and Derrick Phelps also went on to play in the NBA, but were undrafted.

References

Matt Wenstrom-Undrafted in the 1993 NBA Draft, Wentrom nonetheless made the Boston Celtics roster as a free agent. He appeared in 11 games during the 1993–94 season, averaging 1.6 points and 1.1 rebounds per game in his only NBA season.[1]

North Carolina
North Carolina Tar Heels men's basketball seasons
NCAA Division I men's basketball tournament championship seasons
NCAA Division I men's basketball tournament Final Four seasons
North Carolina
Tar
Tar